Celebration High School is a public four year high school located in Celebration, Florida, United States. It is a part of the School District of Osceola County, Florida.

Overview
Celebration High School was graded a 'B' school by the Florida Department of Education. It features an International Baccalaureate program. The graduation rate is currently 92%.

Students have the opportunity to take Advanced Placement course work and exams. The AP participation rate at Celebration High School is 55%. The school currently has a College Readiness Score of 44.1/100.0. 29% of students are economically disadvantaged, and are eligible for free (29%) or reduced-price (1%) lunch as of 2021.

Athletics
Celebration High School competes in the Florida High School Athletic Association (FHSAA) using the nickname of "The Storm."

Athletic Programs offered at Celebration High School:
 Baseball
 Basketball
 Bowling
 Cheerleading
 Cross Country
 Fishing 
 Flag Football
 Football
 Golf
 Lacrosse
 Soccer
 Softball
 Swimming
 Tennis
 Track & Field
 Volleyball
 Weightlifting
 Wrestling

IB Diploma Programme
Celebration High School's IB Diploma Programme was authorized in March 2011. The current coordinator is Alissa Petersen. The program offers a variety of courses including:

 Biology HL/SL
 Chemistry HL/SL
 Environmental Systems and Societies SL
 Dance
 Music
 English A Literature HL
 English A Language and Literature HL
 Global Politics HL/SL
 History HL/SL
 Information Technology in a Global Society
 Math Studies SL
 Mathematics HL/SL
 Philosophy
 Theory of Knowledge
 Visual Arts
 Spanish B
 Spanish AB
 French B
 Mandarin AB

Junior ROTC

Celebration High School has an Air Force Junior ROTC that operates within the school as an elective class. It was established in 2005.

Enrollment characteristics 
Celebration High School enrollment characteristics for the 2019-2020 school year.

Total number of students enrolled: 2,648

Enrollment by gender: 
Female students: 1,334 (50.37%)
Male students: 1,314 (49.63%)

Enrollment by race and ethnicity:
Non-Hispanic White: 742 (28.02%)
African-American: 157 (5.92%)
Asian-American: 91 (3.43%)
American Indian/Alaskan Native: 6 (0.22%)
Hawaiian Native/Pacific Islander: 7 (0.26%)
Hispanic or Latino of any race: 1,569 (59.25%)
Two or More
Races: 76 (2.87%)

References

External links

 Celebration High School

Osceola County Public Schools
Celebration, Florida
Educational institutions established in 2003
High schools in Osceola County, Florida
Public high schools in Florida
2003 establishments in Florida